The Antipodean Film Festival, variously referred to as Festival des Antipodes, Antipodes International Film Festival, Antipodes Film Festival Saint Tropez, Saint Tropez Film Festival and other variations, is a film festival showcasing New Zealand and Australian  films, held annually in St Tropez in France since 1999.

Most of the events take place at the Renaissance Cinema on Place des Lices in Saint Tropez. The event, which runs for three days, includes a Junior Antipodes section and a feature film competition.

The 2021 edition was given the label "Australia Now France 2021-2022", making it part of a celebration of many aspects of Australia in France which includes projects and collaborations throughout the country.

Awards

Many prizes have been awarded since the second edition of the event in 2000. There were no awards given in 2001 or 2020. Former jury members include Bryan Brown, Stéphane Audran, Anthony La Paglia, Tina Arena, Phillip Noyce, Jean-Loup Dabadie, Bruce Beresford, Julie Ferrier, Greta Scacchi, Fred Schepisi, Miranda Otto, Nadia Tass, and many others.

Grand Prix Best Feature Film

The Jury Grand Prix, Best Feature film (Le  Grand Prix du Jury, Meilleur Long Métrage) was awarded in 2000, 2006–2019, and from 2021. The winners of this prize include:

 2000 : Monkey’s Mask by Samantha Lang - AUS
 2001 : No award
 2002 : Beneath Clouds by Ivan Sen - AUS
 2003 : Horseplay by Stavros Kazantzidis - AUS
 2004 : Fracture by Larry Parr - NZ
 2005 : Oyster Farmer by Anna Reeves & The Climb by Bob Swaim – AUS / NZ 
 2006 : Number 2 by Toa Frazer - NZ
 2007 : Clubland by Cherie Nowland - AUS
 2008 : Black Balloon by Elissa Down - AUS 
 2009 : The Strength of Water by Armağan Ballantyne - NZ
 2010 : The Waiting City by Claire McCarthy - AUS
 2011 : Face to Face by Michael Rymer – AUS
 2012 : Red Dog by Kriv Stenders – AUS 
 2013 : Last Dance by David Pulbrook – AUS
 2014 : Healing by Craig Monahan – AUS
 2015 : Paper Planes by Robert Connolly - AUS
 2016 : Last Cab to Darwin by Jeremy Sims - AUS
 2017 : Jasper Jones by Rachel Perkins - AUS
 Mention : The Pā Boys by Himiona Grace - NZ
 2018 : Three Wise Cousins by Stallone Vaiaoga-Ioasa - NZ
 2019 : Ladies in Black by Bruce Beresford - AUS
 2020 : No award

 2021 : Bellbird by Hamish Bennett - NZ

Best Actor
Best Actor (Meilleur Acteur) was created in 2001.

Best Actress

Best Actress (Meilleur Actrice) was created in 2001.

Audience Award

The Audience Award for Best Feature Film (Prix du Public, du Meilleur Long Métrage) has been awarded since 2000.

Nicholas Baudin Award, Best Short Film

Best Short Film (Prix du Meilleur Court Métrage) was awarded in 2000. There was no award for a short film in 2001. The Nicholas Baudin Award/ Nicholas Baudin Prize, (Prix Nicolas Baudin, Meilleur Court Métrage) has been awarded each year since 2002, named in honour of French explorer Nicholas Baudin.  it is supported by the Woodside Valley Foundation.

20th Anniversary Award

The 20th Anniversary Award for Best Antipodes' Short Film (Prix du 20ème anniversaire pour le meilleur court métrage des Antipodes) was awarded to The Virgin, made by Jack Yabsley.

Audience Award, Short Film
The Audience Award, Australian Short Film Today (Prix du Public, Australian Short Film Today) has been awarded since 2020.

References

External links

1999 establishments in France
Film festivals established in 1999